The 1923 Detroit Titans football team represented the University of Detroit as an independent during the 1923 college football season. The team compiled a 4–3–2 record and outscored its opponents by a combined total of 140 to 39.

James F. Duffy retired as the University of Detroit's head football coach after the 1922 season. In January 1923, Germany Schulz was hired as the new head coach. Schulz had played as a center for the University of Michigan and was later inducted into the College Football Hall of Fame.

Schedule

References

Detroit
Detroit Titans football seasons
Detroit Titans football
Detroit Titans football